Great Cockup is a fell in the northern region of the English Lake District, one of the four Uldale Fells (the others being Longlands Fell, Great Sca Fell and Meal Fell).

Description 
Wainwright describes the fell as functional rather than ornamental, writing:

"Viewed from a distance Great Cockup appears as a modest but extensive eminence with no obvious summit and nothing calling for closer inspection. First impressions are confirmed by a tour of exploration, the fell underfoot proving no more attractive than the fell at a distance."

Etymology 

The fell's name originates from the Old English language, a combination of the words cocc and hop, where hop means a secluded valley and cocc means a woodcock or black grouse. So the meaning is probably  "larger fell above the secluded valley where Woodcock or Black Grouse are found". Whaley points out that this is the meaning "with the valley name being transferred to the hills, but without more evidence this cannot be proven".

The fell's name quite often causes mirth because of its slight rudeness and reference to sexual slang. Cockup means a mess-up in the British English language, and the fell was visited by British television personality Denis Norden for one edition of his TV show It'll be Alright on the Night, a programme which consisted of out-takes from film and television that he called "Cockups". The programme was called Alright on the Night's Cockup Trip and was broadcast in 1996. The fell's name has also been adopted for a local beer brewed by the Hesket Newmarket Brewery, called "Great Cockup Porter" a dark-coloured stout with an ABV of 3.3%.

Topography
The lower southern slope of the fell has a large, isolated boulder which is marked on large-scale maps; this is thought to be an erratic left by a retreating glacier. The fell has also yielded some rare fossils with unusual forms of dendroid graptolites being found on the slopes.

Ascent
A direct ascent over Little Cockup is possible but the bracken can be thick at certain times of the year. Great Cockup is separated from Meal Fell,  to the east, by the pass of Trusmadoor.

Summit
The view from the summit is dominated by a good view of Skiddaw's northern slopes while there is an excellent open outlook towards the Scottish Borders.

In popular culture 
On 12 October 1996 Denis Norden presented the TV show It'll Be Alright on the Night in episode 15 Alright on the Night's Cockup Trip. This decision was made as the name of the hill references the theme and content of It'll Be Alright on the Night, which is mistakes made in TV shows.

On 21 December 2020, YouTuber Tom Scott posted a video where he hiked Great Cockup whilst he gave a monologue to camera, in homage to the aforementioned TV show's title sequence which took place on the hill.

References

External links
 Graptolite bearing rocks on Great Cockup
  Hesket Newmarket Brewery
 Alright on the Night's Cockup Trip 1996

Fells of the Lake District
Allerdale